Polistes flavus, also known as the yellow paper wasp, is a species of paper wasp in the family Vespidae.

References

Further reading

External links

 

flavus
Insects described in 1868